This is a list of calypso musicians. Bands and artists are listed by the first letter in their name (not including the words "a", "an", or "the").

Ajamu
André Toussaint
Anslem Douglas
Arrow
Atilla the Hun
Black Stalin
Byron Lee & the Dragonaires
Black Prince
Calypso Rose
Chalkdust
Charles D. Lewis
Crazy
Lord Creator
David Rudder
Denyse Plummer
Denzil Botus
Destra
Drupatee
The Duke of Iron
Freddy Grant
The Growler
Growling Tiger
Grynner
Gypsy
Gorilla
Harry Belafonte
Jolly Boys
"King" Eric Gibson
King Radio
King Short Shirt
Lord Beginner
Lord Brynner
Lord Caresser
Lord Executor
Lord Intruder
Lord Invader
Lord Kitchener
Lord Melody
Lord Mouse and the Kalypso Katz
Lord Pretender
Lord Radio
Lord Shorty
Lord Woodbine
The Merrymen
Mighty Bomber
Mighty Cypher
Mighty Destroyer
Mighty Dougla
The Mighty Duke
Mighty Gabby
Mighty Panther
Mighty Shadow
Mighty Sparrow
Mighty Spoiler
Mighty Striker
Mighty Terror
Ras Shorty I
Red Plastic Bag
Roaring Lion
Robert Mitchum
Sam Manning
Serenata Guayanesa
Singing Sandra
Sir Galba
Sir Lancelot
Sugar Aloes
Superblue
The Talbot Brothers of Bermuda
Walter Ferguson
The Wounded Soldier
Wilmoth Houdini
Young Pretender
Young Tiger
Your Song Is Good

See also 

Carnival Road March
List of chutney musicians
List of calypsos with sociopolitical influences
Lists of musicians

References

External links
Bibliography of Barbadian Calypsonians

 
Calypsonians